Che Puan Sarimah binti Ibrahim (born 19 February 1978) is a Malaysian television host, radio announcer, actress and singer.

Personal life
Sarimah was born in Dublin, Ireland to a Malaysian father of Malays descent, Ibrahim Ahmad from Batu Pahat, Johor and an Irish mother from Kilkenny, Ireland. She is the eldest of four siblings. She spent her secondary school years at Emirates International School in Dubai. She also attends Wesley College, Dublin where she obtained her O-Levels. Sarimah holds an Advanced Diploma in Psychology from College of Allied Educators in Singapore and Bachelor's Degree of Psychology (Hons) from HELP University in Malaysia.

Career
In 2001, she released her debut album “Sarimah”. In 2009, she became the first Malaysian celebrity to host the first season of The Biggest Loser Asia on Hallmark Channel Asia. She has won several awards as TV Host including Anugerah Seri Angkasa as Best TV Presenter in 2011. She released an English single of ‘You On My Mind’ in 2013 and a Bahasa Malaysia single of ‘Destinasiku’ in 2016.

Sarimah has also been an announcer for Red FM and Mix FM radio stations for its flagship breakfast programme the Mix Breakfast Show alongside Rod for two years.

Marriage and issue 
In 2006, Sarimah was married to an Australian man, Amir Andrew Abdullah (née Andrew John Browning) but the couple divorced on 15 May 2009.

In April 2015, she married His Highness Tunku Nadzimuddin Tunku Mudzaffar (also known as Tunku Jamie), a grandson of the tenth Yang di-Pertuan Besar Negeri Sembilan, Tuanku Ja’afar ibni Almarhum Tuanku Abdul Rahman and Tunku Ampuan Najihah. Her father-in-law is Tunku Mudzaffar ibni Tunku Mustapha,the Tunku Kecil Besar of Negeri Sembilan and her mother-in-law is Tunku Naquiah binti Almarhum Tuanku Ja’afar,the Tunku Dara of Negeri Sembilan. 

They previously were engaged on 27 September 2014. They also had a private wedding ceremony at one of the prestigious hotel in Kuala Lumpur. 

Upon her marriage she was awarded the title of Che Puan (equivalent to the English "Lady") as a Prince's consort that was non-royal blood. She is styled as Yang Berbahagia (The Felicitous).

Sarimah and Tunku Jamie had a daughter together named Tunku Sofia Najihah. She was born on 19 July 2019.

Discography 

 Sarimah (2001)

Filmography

Film

Television

Endorsements

Awards and nominations

References

External links
 

1979 births
20th-century Irish singers
21st-century Irish singers
Malaysian people of Irish descent
Living people
Malaysian actresses
Malaysian radio announcers
Malaysian television personalities
Malay-language singers
Irish people of Malaysian descent
Irish actresses
Irish television personalities
Malaysian infotainers
Akademi Fantasia
20th-century Irish women singers
21st-century Irish women singers
Irish Muslims
Malaysian Muslims
Princesses by marriage
Negeri Sembilan royal consorts
Malaysian people of Malay descent